This is a list of notable painters from, or associated with, Turkey.

A
 Haluk Akakçe (born 1970)
 Ahmet Ziya Akbulut (1869-1938)
 Halil Altındere (born 1971)
 Avni Arbaş (1919-2003)
 Burak Arıkan (born 1976)
 Hale Asaf (1905-1938)
 Tomur Atagok (born 1939)
 Ruzen Atakan (born 1966)

B
 İbrahim Balaban (born 1921)
 Bedri Baykam (born 1957)

C
 Taner Ceylan (born 1967)
 Sevgi Çağal (born 1957)
 Nevin Çokay (1930-2012)
 Adnan Çoker (born 1927)
 Nusret Çolpan (1952-2008)
 Gürkan Coşkun (born 1941)

D
 Abidin Dino (1913-1993)
 Burhan Doğançay (1929-2013)

E
 Nese Erdok (born 1940)
 Bedri Rahmi Eyüboğlu (1913-1975)

F
 Ertuğrul Oğuz Fırat (1923–2014)

G
 Erkan Geniş (born 1943)
 Bahadır Gökay (born 1955)
 Genco Gulan (born 1969)
 Hatice Güleryüz (born 1968)
 Nazmi Ziya Güran (1881-1937)
 Mehmet Güreli (born 1949)

H
 Osman Hamdi Bey (1842-1910)
 Haydar Hatemi (born 1945)

K
 Ömer Ali Kazma (born 1971)

L
 Abdulcelil Levni (1680-1732)

N
 Elif Naci (1898-1987)

O
 Setenay Özbek (born 1961)

P
 Halil Paşa (1857-1939)
 Hüseyin Zekai Paşa (1860-1919)
 Şeker Ahmet Paşa (1841-1907)

R
 Hasan Rıza (1857−1913)
 Hoca Ali Riza (1858-1939)

S 
 Ibrahim Safi (1898-1983)
 Gizem Saka (born 1978)
 Fikret Mualla Saygı (1904-1967)
 Sarkis Zabunyan (born 1938)
 Sevil Soyer (born 1950)

T
 Sali Turan (born 1949)

See also
 A History of Modern Turkish painting

List
Turkish
Painters